Fischer is a German occupational surname, meaning fisherman. The name Fischer is the fourth most common German surname. The English version is Fisher.

People with the surname

A 
 Abraham Fischer (1850–1913) South African public official
 Adam Fischer (sculptor) (1888–1968), Danish sculptor
 Ádám Fischer (born 1949), Hungarian conductor
 Adolph Fischer (1858-1887) Anarchist Martyr
 Adolf Fischer (officer) (1893–1947), German Nazi general executed for war crimes

 Alfred Fischer (judge) (1919–2004), German judge
 Alfred Fischer (architect) (1881–1950), German architect
 Annie Fischer (1914–1995), Hungarian pianist
 Andrea Fischer (born 1960), German politician
 Anton Fischer (bobsleigh), German bobsledder
 Artur Fischer (1919–2016), German inventor (fischertechnik, plastic dowel)
 Axel Fischer (born 1966), German politician

B 
 Batty Fischer (1877–1958), Luxembourg dentist and amateur photographer
 Bernd Fischer (disambiguation)
 Birgit Fischer (born 1962), German kayaker
 Bobby Fischer (1943–2008), American world chess champion 1972–1975
 Bram Fischer (1908–1975), South African lawyer

C 
 Carl Fischer (disambiguation)
 Carlos Fischer (1903–1969), Uruguayan politician, President of the National Council of Government in 1958
 Caroline Fischer-Achten (1806–1896), Austrian opera singer
 Catherine Fischer (born 1947), American deafblind author
 Christian Fischer (born 1997), American ice hockey forward
 Christopher Fischer (born 1988), German ice hockey defenceman
 Clare Fischer (1928–2012), American composer, arranger, and pianist
 Claude S. Fischer (born 1948), American sociologist

D 
 D'or Fischer (born 1981), Israeli-American basketball player in the Israeli National League
 Dana Fischer (born 2010), American Magic: The Gathering player
 David Fischer (disambiguation)
 Deb Fischer (born 1951), American politician
 Debra Fischer, American astronomer
 Diego Fischer (born 1961), Uruguayan journalist and writer
 Dietrich Fischer-Dieskau (1925–2012), German baritone and conductor
 Dirk Fischer (politician) (born 1943), German politician

E 
 Edmond H. Fischer (1920–2021), Swiss-American biochemist
 Eduard Fischer (general) (1862–1935), Austrian colonel in World War I
 Edwin Fischer (1886–1960), Swiss pianist and conductor
 Elizabeth Fischer Monastero, American mezzo-soprano
 Emil Fischer (disambiguation)
 Emily V. Fischer (born 1979 or 1980), American atmospheric chemist
 Ernst Fischer (disambiguation)
 Esther Fischer-Homberger (1940–2019), Swiss psychiatrist and medical historian
 Eugen Fischer (historian) (1899–1973), geologist and historian
 Eugen Fischer (1874–1967), anthropologist, doctor and member of the Nazi party
 Eva Fischer (1920–2015), Croatian Italian artist

F 
 Franz Joseph Emil Fischer (1877–1948), chemist, famous for the Fischer-Tropsch process
 Friedrich Ernst Ludwig von Fischer (1782–1854), botanist
 Fritz Fischer (biathlete) (born 1956), sportsman
 Fritz Fischer (1908–1999), German historian

G 
 Georg Fischer (disambiguation)
 George R. Fischer (1937–2016), US underwater archaeologist, a pioneer of the field in the National Park Service
 Gerhard Fischer (disambiguation)
 Gisela Fischer (1929–2014), German actress
 Gottfried Fischer (1944–2013), German psychologist, psychotherapist and psychoanalyst
 Gottfried Bermann Fischer (1897–1995), Jewish-German publisher of the S. Fischer Verlag
 Gotthilf Fischer (1928–2020), German choral conductor
 Greg Fischer (born 1958), American businessman and mayor of Louisville, KY
 Gustav Fischer (equestrian) (1915–1990), Swiss Olympian in equestrian
 Gustav Fischer (1848–1886), German physician and explorer of Africa

H
 H. L. Fischer (1822–1909) (Henry Lee Fischer), Pennsylvania German language writer and translator
 Hans Fischer (1881–1945), German chemist, 1930 Nobel Prize in Chemistry
 Heidemarie Fischer (1944–2022), German politician
 Heike Fischer (born 1982), German diver
 Heinz Fischer (born 1938), Federal President of Austria
 Helene Fischer (born 1984), German pop music singer
 Hermann Emil Fischer (1852–1919), German chemist, 1902 Nobel prizewinner, and inventor of the Fischer projection
 Horst Fischer (1912–1966), German SS concentration camp doctor executed for war crimes
 Howard Fischer, curator of the New York Jazz Museum
 Ignjat Fischer (1870–1948), Croatian architect

I 
 Ilse Fischer (born 1975), Austrian mathematician
 Iván Fischer (born 1951), Jewish-Hungarian conductor
 Ivana Fišer or Ivana Fischer (1905–1967), Croatian conductor

J 
 Jan Fischer (politician), Prime Minister-designate of the Czech Republic
 James Fischer (1927–2004), American engineer
 Jason Fischer (disambiguation)
 Jean Fischer (1867–?), French cyclist
 Jean Chrétien Fischer (1716–1762), German-born French soldier
 Jenna Fischer (born 1974), American actress
 Jiří Fischer (born 1980), Czech ice hockey player
 Murder of Joey Fischer Joey Fischer (1976–1993), American murder
 Johann Fischer (disambiguation)
 John Fischer (disambiguation)
 Joschka Fischer (born 1948), German foreign minister
 Josef Fischer (cyclist) (1865–1953), German racing cyclist
 Joseph Fischer (disambiguation)
 Julia Fischer (born 1983), German violinist

K 
 Karl Fischer (disambiguation)
 Kate Fischer (born 1973), Australian model and actress
 Klaus Fischer (born 1949), German football (soccer) player and coach
 Kuno Fischer (1824–1907), German philosopher
 Kurt Rudolf Fischer (1922–2014), Jewish-Austrian philosopher
 Kurt W. Fischer (1943–2020), American developmental psychologist

L 
 Laurence Fischer (born 1973), French karateka
 Lisa Fischer (born 1958), American singer
 Lothar Fischer (1933–2004), German sculptor
 Louis Fischer (1896–1970), American journalist
 Ludwig Fischer (1905–1947), German Nazi lawyer and government official executed for war crimes
 Ludwig Fischer (bass) (1745–1825), German opera singer
 Ludwig Fischer (racing driver) (1915–1991), German racing driver
 Ludwig Hans Fischer (1848–1915), Austrian landscape painter and etcher

M 
 Manuel Fischer (born 1989), German footballer
 Marcel Fischer (born 1978), Swiss fencer
 Martin Fischer (automobile designer) (1867–1947), Swiss automobile designer
 Martin Fischer (tennis), Austrian professional tennis player
 Martin Fischer-Dieskau (born 1954), German conductor, son of Dietrich Fischer-Dieskau
 Mathias Fischer (basketball) (born 1971), German basketball player and coach
 Michael J. Fischer (born 1942), American computer scientist
 Minna Fischer (1858–1941), Australian soprano and singing teacher in London
 Móric Fischer de Farkasházy (1799–1880), Hungarian porcelain manufacturer

N 
 Nilla Fischer (born 1984), Swedish (soccer) football player

O
 Oskar Fischer (disambiguation), multiple people
 Ottfried Fischer (born 1953), German actor and cabaret artist
 Otto Fischer (footballer) (1901–1941), Austrian (soccer) football player and coach
 O. W. Fischer, Otto Wilhelm Fischer (1915–2004), Austrian actor
 Øystein Fischer (1942–2013), Norwegian physicist

P 
 Pat Fischer (born 1940), American football player
 Patrick Fischer (disambiguation)
 Paul Fischer (disambiguation)

R 
 Rainer Fischer (born 1949), German-Canadian judoka
 Ricardo Fischer (born 1991), Brazilian basketball player
 Richard Fischer (1917–1969), Austrian footballer
 Robert Fischer (disambiguation)
 Ruth Fischer (1895–1961), German communist

S 
 Samuel von Fischer (1859–1934), German publisher, founder of the S. Fischer Verlag
 Sascha Fischer (born 1971), German rugby union player
 Scott Fischer (1956–1996), American mountain guide
 Stanley Fischer (born 1943), American and Israeli central banker
 Steven Thomas Fischer (born 1972) American filmmaker and cartoonist of German descent
 Stewart "Dirk" Fischer (1924–2013), American composer, musician and jazz educator
 Sven Fischer (born 1971), German biathlete
 Sven Fischer (footballer), German football defender

T 
 Theobald Fischer (1846–1910), German geographer
 Theodor Fischer (1862–1938), German architect
 Theodor Fischer (fencer), German Olympic épée and foil fencer 
 Thomas Fischer (disambiguation), several people
 Thierry Fischer (born 1957), Swiss conductor and flautist
 Tim Fischer (1946–2019), Australian politician

V
 Vera Fischer (actress) (born 1951), Brazilian actress
 Vera Fischer (sculptor) (1925–2009), Croatian sculptor
 Viktor Fischer (born 1994), Danish football player
 Viktor Fischer (wrestler) (1892–1977), Austrian Olympic wrestler

W
 Werner Fischer (crystallographer) (born 1931)
 Werner Fischer (sailor) (1940–2011)
 Werner Fischer-Weppler, German curler
 Wild Man Fischer (1945–2011), Outsider musician
 Wilhelm Fischer (boxer) ("Willi" Fischer) (born 1972), German boxer
 Wilhelm Fischer (politician) ("Willy" Fischer) (1904–1951), German politician

Z 
 Zel M. Fischer (born 1963), Missouri Supreme Court judge

See also

Fischler

German-language surnames
Occupational surnames